Stop the Panic is a collaborative album by Luke Vibert and BJ Cole, released in 2000.

Critical reception
John Bush of AllMusic gave the album 4 stars out of 5 and said, "On most tracks, Cole's shimmering, fluid guitar lines are simply assimilated into Vibert's kitchen-sink production style". Paul Cooper of Pitchfork gave the album a 6.7 out of 10, commenting that "Though Cole runs through the primer on the Hawaiian glide and the Nashville glissando, Vibert's straight-ahead beats cut the cheese to a tolerable minimum."

In 2013, Spin named it one of the 20 best Astralwerks albums.

Track listing

Personnel
 Luke Vibert – programming
 BJ Cole – steel guitar, cheng, etc.
 Bobby Valentino – violin, mandolin, guitar
 Ben Davies – cello
 Guy Jackson – synthesizer, piano
 Tom Jenkinson – electric bass
 Andy Hamill – double bass
 Jeremy Simmonds – percussion

References

External links
 
 Stop the Panic at Astralwerks

2000 albums
B. J. Cole albums
Luke Vibert albums
Astralwerks albums